Petrus Josephus "Piet" Raijmakers (born 29 September 1956, in Asten) is a former equestrian from the Netherlands.

Raijmakers won the gold medal in the show jumping team event at the 1992 Summer Olympics in Barcelona, Spain. He did so alongside Jos Lansink, Jan Tops and Bert Romp. In the individual jumping competition Raijmakers claimed the silver medal on Ratina Z, behind Germany's Ludger Beerbaum on Classic Touch.

In 2006, Raijmakers won team gold alongside Jeroen Dubbeldam, Gerco Schröder and  Albert Zoer at the World Equestrian Games in Aachen.

At the World Cup-horse show "Indoor Brabant" in 's-Hertogenbosch (March 2010), he ended his sporting career. His sons, Piet Raijmakers Jr. and Joep Raijmakers, are also active equestrians.

References

 Dutch Olympic Committee 
 DatabaseOlympics profile

External links
 

1956 births
Living people
Dutch show jumping riders
Olympic equestrians of the Netherlands
Dutch male equestrians
Equestrians at the 1992 Summer Olympics
Olympic gold medalists for the Netherlands
Olympic silver medalists for the Netherlands
People from Asten, Netherlands
Olympic medalists in equestrian
Medalists at the 1992 Summer Olympics
Sportspeople from North Brabant
20th-century Dutch people